Colonnaded Street is located in downtown Beirut, Lebanon. it was an important street of Roman Berytus.

Overview

A commercial street with numbered shops, dating to the Byzantine period, was unearthed during the mid-1990s excavations. In 1996 was made the discovery of 700 sqm of Byzantine mosaics in the Souks area of Beirut, most dating back to the 5th and 6th centuries AD. They were recovered from five large villas and a colonnaded street with its shops. The colonnades had mosaic pavements with Greek letters marking the address of each shop. Most mosaics displayed geometric patterns, although a few incorporated figurative designs.

Construction

Beirut prospered during Roman and Byzantine times, until the earthquake of 551 AD destroyed the city of Roman Berytus. One of its most important streets was brought to light during the archaeological investigations of the souks site in the mid-1990s: a colonnaded shopping street with sidewalks, which connected the center to the Hippodrome in Wadi Abu Jamil.

The 400-meter-long Colonnaded street was paved with successive layers of mosaics, displaying various geometric patterns and natural motifs. More than ten shops were discovered during the excavations, each one identified by a Greek letter marked on the mosaic floor.

History

Beirut greatly prospered during Roman and Byzantine times. One of its most important streets was brought to light during the archaeological investigations of the Beirut Souks site in the mid-1990s: a colonnaded shopping street with sidewalks, which connected the center to the Hippodrome or race-track in Wadi Abu Jamil. The 400-meter-long colonnaded street was paved with successive layers of mosaics, displaying various geometric patterns and natural motifs.

More than ten shops of a colonnaded "Portico" were discovered during the excavations, each one identified by a Greek letter (Alpha, Beta, Gamma, Delta…) marked on the mosaic floor. These were written from right to left in a manner similar to Arabic script because the street ran from east to west. A reproduction of the salvaged mosaics, with the Greek letters Beta, Gamma and Delta, is integrated into Souk al-Franj near its original location. The mosaic panel is in alignment with the ancient colonnaded street.

A group of five columns found on the left of the St. George Maronite Cathedral, were once part of a grand colonnade of Roman Berytus: they were found in 1963.

Timeline

551 AD: Destruction of Beirut by earthquake.
Mid-1990: Discovery of a colonnaded shopping street with sidewalks.

See also
 Roman Berytus
 Byzantine mosaics
 Hippodrome of Roman Berytus
 Wadi Abu Jamil
 Beirut Souks
 Mosaics
 Cisterns of the Roman Baths, Beirut
 Roman Baths, Beirut

Notes

Bibliography
Perring, Dominic (1997-1998) "Excavations in the Souks of Beirut: An introduction of the work of the British Lebanese team and summary report", Berytus, vol. 43: 9-34
 Seeden, Helga et al. (1995). Urban archaeology 1994: Excavations of the Souks Area- Beirut, Solidere, Beirut.

Buildings and structures in Beirut
Monuments and memorials in Lebanon
Archaeological sites in Lebanon
Roman sites in Lebanon
Tourist attractions in Beirut